Total Balalaika Show is a 1994 film by director Aki Kaurismäki featuring a concert by the Leningrad Cowboys and the Alexandrov Ensemble.

The concert took place on 12 June 1993 on Senate Square in Helsinki, Finland. The event drew a crowd of approximately 70,000 people from two nations – Finland and Russia – that had been engaged in a state of "peaceful coexistence" during the Cold War.

The concert featured an eclectic mix of Western rock and Russian folk music, and folk dancers performing to rock songs.

Total Balalaika Show was a critical success, scoring a 77% Fresh rating on Rotten Tomatoes.

Songs 
The "rockumentary" features 13 songs from the concert:

 Finlandia
 Let's Work Together
 The Volga Boatmen's Song
 Happy Together
 Delilah
 Knockin' on Heaven's Door
 Oh, Field
 Kalinka
 Gimme All Your Lovin'
 Jewelry Box
 Sweet Home Alabama
 Dark Eyes
 Those Were The Days

DVD release 
The film is available on three DVD releases. The first, released by Sandrew Metronome in 2004, is for DVD Region 2. The second, released by Facets, is for all regions. The third is by The Criterion Collection in an Eclipse box set with the two original films.

Soundtrack Album

External links 
Balalaika music records SKAZ

Criterion Collection Essay

1994 films
Swedish comedy films
Finnish comedy films
Finnish rock music films
Concert films
Films directed by Aki Kaurismäki
1990s Finnish-language films
Films shot in Finland
Swedish documentary films
Finnish documentary films
1990s Swedish films